Deeside Community Hospital is a community hospital in Aston Park, Flintshire, Wales. It is managed by the Betsi Cadwaladr University Health Board.

History
The hospital, which was commissioned to replace the aging Mancot Royal Hospital, was opened by the Queen in 1992. A new rehabilitation unit for elderly people was completed in 2004. The health board were forced to close a ward in 2014 due to staff shortages. Lord Barry Jones opened a new suite of "dementia friendly" facilities in July 2017.

References

NHS hospitals in Wales
Hospitals established in 1992
Hospital buildings completed in 1992
Hospitals in Flintshire
Betsi Cadwaladr University Health Board